Valery Petrovich Bogdanov (born 9 January 1952) is a Russian professional football coach and a former player.

External links
 

1952 births
Sportspeople from Samara, Russia
Living people
Soviet footballers
Soviet football managers
Russian football managers
PFC Krylia Sovetov Samara managers
Russian Premier League managers
Russian expatriate football managers
Expatriate football managers in Bangladesh
Association football goalkeepers